Richlands Historic District may refer to:

Richlands Historic District (Richlands, North Carolina), listed on the National Register of Historic Places (NRHP) in Onslow County, North Carolina
Richlands Historic District (Richlands, Virginia), NRHP-listed in Tazewell County

See also
Richland Historic District (disambiguation)